Precompact set may refer to:

 Relatively compact subspace, a subset whose closure is compact
 Totally bounded set, a subset that can be covered by finitely many subsets of fixed size